Fair Labor Association (FLA) (a non-profit designed to complement existing international and national labor laws)
Industrial Workers of the World (IWW) (an international union open to all laborers)
International Centre for Trade Union Rights (an organizing and campaigning body for trade unions and trade unionists)
International Labor Rights Forum (ILRF) (a non profit organization dedicated to preserving the rights of workers around the world with a particular emphasis on sweatshops and child labor)
International Labour Organization (ILO) (an agency of the United Nations to deal with labor issues)
Socialist International (a worldwide organization of social democratic, labor, and democratic socialist political partie

See also
Fair Wear Foundation (FWA)
Labor movement
List of federations of trade unions
List of left-wing internationals
List of trade unions
Political international
Trade Justice Movement (TJM)

Society-related lists

Lists of organizations